Enrique Lingenfelder (11 May 1928 – 2 December 2020) was an Argentine rower. He competed in the men's eight event at the 1948 Summer Olympics.

References

External links
 

1928 births
2020 deaths
Argentine male rowers
Olympic rowers of Argentina
Rowers at the 1948 Summer Olympics
Sportspeople from Rosario, Santa Fe